The Reactor is a custom car built by Gene Winfield. The low slung car featured height adjustable suspension, front wheel drive, and a powerful engine, and appeared in episodes of four TV series:  Bewitched, Star Trek, Batman, and Mission: Impossible.

Origin 
After completing construction of his Strip Star car, Winfield's next project was even more ambitious. Joe Kizis, an East Coast show promoter, held an annual Autorama, an indoor rod and custom car show in Hartford, Connecticut. Kizis gave Winfield a $20,000 commission to build an aluminum-bodied show car named the Autorama Special. Designed by Ben Delphia of The Art Center College of Design, this vehicle later became known as The Reactor.  Winfield entered The Reactor in the 1966 Grand National Roadster Show where it won the Tournament of Fame Award.

1960s  television appearances
Winfield brought The Reactor to Hollywood in 1966. “I didn’t know anybody” according to Winfield. He managed to show the car to the 20th Century Fox Studios transportation coordinator, and within two weeks the unique car had landed a television role.
 Bewitched, episode "Super Car" S3 E19 produced by Screen Gems.
 Star Trek, episode "Bread and Circuses" (as the Jupiter 8) S2 E25 produced by Paramount Television. At least 18 different publicity photos were taken with The Reactor and William Shatner.
 Batman, episode "The Funny Feline Felonies" (as the Catmobile) S3 E16 produced by 20th Century Fox Studios 
 "Mission: Impossible", episode "The Freeze"

Reactor today
Creator Gene Winfield owns The Reactor, which was shown on the lawn at the Pebble Beach Concours d'Elegance in 2017.

Construction details 
Reactor is a front-engined front wheel drive two seater. The bodywork, like that on Winfield's Strip Star, is of lightweight aluminum. The front wheels are exposed and fenderless, while the rears are enclosed by the bodywork and skirts. The roof panel is hinged at the rear and, together with the windshield, tilts up and back to give access to the interior.

Reactor was finished in a trademark Winfield fadeaway paint job, changing from metalflake gold on top to green below.

The car's low hoodline was made possible by its use of a version of the Chevrolet Turbo-Air 6 engine. A similar engine was used in The Man from U.N.C.L.E.'s Piranha.

References

Sources 
Jonnie King's Hall Of Fame Legends Series. Legends.thewwbc.net

External links
 
 
 IMCDb
 Justacarguy (photos)
 Fotki (photos)

Modified vehicles
Automotive styling features
One-off cars
1960s cars
1970s cars
Fictional cars
Kustom Kulture
Individual cars
Front-wheel-drive vehicles
Cars powered by boxer engines